The Miss New York USA competition is the pageant that selects the representative for the state of New York in the Miss USA pageant. It is directed by D&D Productions.

The current titleholder is Heather Nunez of New York City was crowned on June 4, 2022, at the Seneca Niagara Casino & Hotel in Niagara Falls, New York. She represented New York for the title of Miss USA 2022.

Background
New York is one of the most successful states at Miss USA, and is ranked third in terms of number and value of placement across all years of competition. New York's strongest run was an unbroken string of placements from 1957 to 1966. New York also had a streak of 3 consecutive 1st runner-up placements from 1972 to 1974. In 1954, Karin Huitman was 2nd runner-up. She later moved up to be 1st runner-up, as the original 1st runner-up, Miss Virginia USA was dethroned due to underage (she was 16). As there was no rule in 1954 that if Miss USA won Miss Universe, first runner-up became Miss USA, Karin was only 1st runner-up. Huitman went on to become Miss World USA 1954 and 1st runner-up at Miss World 1954.

New York has the third (equal) highest number of Miss USA victories. They also have the third highest number of semi-finalist (or better) placings (33).

Four Miss New York USAs have competed at Miss Teen USA, including one who went on to win the Miss USA crown: Kimberly Pressler and the other inherited the Miss USA title: Shanna Moakler. Of these, only three held the title Miss New York Teen USA; one represented Rhode Island (Moakler) and one New Hampshire (Maureen Murray).  Only one Miss New York USA has competed at Miss America.

Gallery of titleholders

Results summary

Placements in Miss USA
Miss USAs: Jackie Loughery (1952), Mary Therese Friel (1979), Kimberly Pressler (1999)
1st runner-up:  Karin Hultman (1954), Mary Rodite (1960), Alberta Phillips (1972), Susan Carlson (1973), Barbara Cooper (1974), Shanna Moakler (1995)
2nd runner-up: Renee Roy (1954)
3rd runner-up: Alexa Currey (1961)
4th runner-up: Arlene Nesbitt (1959)
Top 6: Jennifer Gareis (1994)
Top 10/11/12: Janet Kadlecik (1955), Patricia O'Kane (1955), Virginia Fox (1958), Jeanne Marie Quinn (1963), Debra Sue Maurice (1980), Jennifer Mikelinich (1983), Maureen Murray (1991), Wendy Mock (1993), Carrie Tucker (2000), Karla Cavalli (2002), Meaghan Jarensky (2005),  Hannah Lopa (2017), Andreia Gibau (2020)
Top 15/16/20: Reta Knapp (1953), Sanita Pelkey (1957), Sherralyn Patecell (1962), Dorothy Langhans (1964), Gloria Jon (1965), Nancy Self (1966), June West (1968), Rosemary Hradek (1969), Christina Tefft (1970), Amber Collins (2011), Thatiana Diaz (2015)

New York holds a record of 37 placements at Miss USA.

Awards
Miss Photogenic: Barbara Cooper (1974), Florinda Kajtazi (2019)
Best State Costume: Nancy Self (1966)

Winners
Color key

Notes

Pageant Hosts 2020: Augusto Valverde (TV Host from Global Child) & Hanna Lopa

References

External links
Official site of Miss New York USA
Miss New York USA 2004 Jaclyn Nesheiwat on Wikimedia Commons

New York
New York (state) culture
 
 
Recurring events established in 1952
1952 establishments in New York (state)